Florian Fandler (born 8th October 1987) is a German diver.

He won a bronze medal in the 10 m mixed synchro platform competition at the 2018 European Aquatics Championships.

References

1987 births
Living people
German male divers
21st-century German people